Wolverine Blues is the third studio album by Swedish death metal band Entombed, released on 4 October 1993 by Earache Records. The album displays a completely different sound from previous releases, combining elements of hard rock, heavy metal, and hardcore punk while still retaining much of their traditional, death metal roots, in a style that would later be known as death 'n' roll. The band also adopted a mid-tempo groove metal style for this release, similar to that of American band Pantera.

Marvel
One version of Wolverine Blues was released with Marvel Comics' character Wolverine on the cover, despite Entombed never wanting their album to be associated with the superhero. Earache Records, without the band's permission, had made a deal with Marvel in order to use Wolverine to promote the album to a more mainstream audience, with the music video for the title track prominently featuring illustrations of the character. This edition included a Wolverine mini-comic inside the CD booklet. The Marvel edition was also heavily edited, with the track "Out of Hand" being removed entirely. A limited number of early pressings of the album contained audio samples taken from films (most notably Flatliners and Hellraiser III) which were subsequently removed from later pressing due to record label fears of potential legal action over their unlicensed use.

Reception
In 2005, Wolverine Blues was ranked number 494 in Rock Hard magazine's book of The 500 Greatest Rock & Metal Albums of All Time. The guitar magazine Guitar World labeled Wolverine Blues as "1994’s best death metal effort and quite possibly the finest death metal album of this decade."

Track listing

Credits
Lars-Göran Petrov – vocals
Uffe Cederlund – guitar, tambourine
Lars Rosenberg – bass
Alex Hellid – guitar
Nicke Andersson – drums, design, artwork
Tomas Skogsberg – producer, engineer
Z. Benny Rehn – photography

References

Earache Records albums
1993 albums
Entombed (band) albums